Maiestas banda is a species of bug from the Cicadellidae family that can be found in India and Liberia. It was formerly placed within Recilia, but a 2009 revision moved it to Maiestas.

References

Insects of Africa
Hemiptera of Asia
Maiestas